Ames is an unincorporated community and census-designated place in southern Dodge County, Nebraska, United States. As of the 2010 census it had a population of 24.

Ames lies along U.S. Route 30, west of the city of Fremont, the county seat of Dodge County. Although Ames is unincorporated, it has a post office, with the ZIP code of 68621.

History
A post office was established at Ames in 1885. The community was formerly named Ketchum but renamed Ames,  likely for Oakes Ames, a Union Pacific Railroad official. Ames was a station and shipping point on the Union Pacific Railroad.

Demographics

Ames' population declined from 24 to 14 between the 2010 and 2020 Censuses.

References

Census-designated places in Dodge County, Nebraska
Census-designated places in Nebraska